Grey—Simcoe was a federal electoral district represented in the House of Commons of Canada from 1968 to 1988. It was located in the province of Ontario. This riding was created in 1966 from parts of Grey North, Grey—Bruce and Simcoe East ridings.

It initially consisted of the City of Owen Sound, the Village of Chatsworth and the Townships of Collingwood, Euphrasia, Holland, Osprey, St. Vincent and Sydenham in the County of Grey; and Christian Islands Indian reserve No. 30 and the Townships of Flos, Nottawasaga, Sunnidale and Tiny (excepting the Town of Penetanguishene) in the County of Simcoe.

In 1976, it was redefined to consist of the City of Owen Sound, the Townships of Artemesia, Collingwood, Euphrasia, Proton, Osprey, Sarawak, St. Vincent and Sydenham (including the Town of Markdale) in the County of Grey; and the Townships of Nottawasaga and Sunnidale (including the Town of Wasaga Beach) in the County of Simcoe.

The electoral district was abolished in 1987 when it was redistributed between Bruce—Grey, Simcoe Centre, Simcoe North and Wellington—Grey—Dufferin—Simcoe ridings.

Members of Parliament

This riding has elected the following Members of Parliament:

Election results

|}

|}

|}

|}

|}

|}

See also 

 List of Canadian federal electoral districts
 Past Canadian electoral districts

External links 
Riding history from the Library of Parliament

Former federal electoral districts of Ontario